Gunnar Vingren (1879–1933) was a Swedish Pentecostal missionary evangelist. He served in the early twentieth century in the Amazon and Northeast Brazil. The Assembly of God in Brazil came from his work.

History

Early life
Gunnar Vingren was born in Östra Husby, Sweden. Vingren's father was a gardener. Vingren grew up in a Christian home. When he was only 18, he believed the Holy Spirit spoke to him and told him he would be a missionary.

United States
In 1903, he emigrated to the United States, where he majored in pastoral studies at Chicago Theological Seminary. In 1909, Gunnar experienced a desire to receive Baptism in the Holy Spirit. He taught at some Scandinavian Baptist churches and decided to follow his missionary vocation.

He later went to South Bend, Indiana, where the church received the Good News and became a  Pentecostal Church with 20 people baptized in the Holy Spirit. At a prayer meeting in Indiana, God said that he would do missions in a Pará, Brazil. At another praying meeting, Daniel Berg was asked to accompany him to Brazil. On November 5, 1910, Gunnar and Berg left New York Port and headed to Pará, Brazil.

Brazil
On November 19, Gunnar and Berg landed in Brazil and settled  in Belém. They studied Portuguese and propagated the Pentecostal doctrinel way, initially proselytizing among Baptists in Belém and then between bordering the Amazon and northeastern Brazil.

On June 18, 1911, in the home of Celina de Albuquerque, Gunnar and Berg founded the first Brazilian Assemblies of God church.

Gunnar met a nurse named Frida Strandburg. He later married Frida in Belém do Pará in Brazil. In the 1920s, Gunnar moved to the south to extend their missionary activity. Worked in the organization of the nascent Assemblies of God by creating publications, convening the General Convention of the Assemblies of God in Brazil, and compiling a hymnal. Gunnar Vingren and his family went south, passing through Rio de Janeiro, Santa Catarina and São Paulo. After another series of trips, Gunnar returned a few years later to live permanently in Rio de Janeiro. As in Pará, the Pentecostal work in Rio de Janeiro grew exponentially. On August 15, 1932, Gunnar Vingren, the pastor, and his family said their goodbyes to the church in Rio de Janeiro and Brazil.

Death
Gunnar, who was living in Brazil, started to have health problems. He returned to Sweden, where his state worsened and led to his death in 1933 at the age of 53.

See also
 Assembleias de Deus
 Assembly of God
 Assembly of God Bethlehem Ministry
 List of Assemblies of God people

References

External links

1879 births
1933 deaths
Assemblies of God people
Protestant missionaries in Brazil
Swedish Pentecostal missionaries
Chicago Theological Seminary alumni
Arminian ministers